Idel Torriente Leal (born September 9, 1986) is a Cuban amateur boxer who won the Pan American featherweight title 2007 and qualified for the Olympics.

Career
In 2006 the southpaw beat teenage star Roniel Iglesias in the semis of the bantamweight national championships but lost the final to superstar Guillermo Rigondeaux 4:13.

He went up to featherweight and won the national title vs Ivan Oñate 21:18.
At the PanAms 2007 he beat Jesús Cuéllar (Arg), Nicholas Walters (Jam), Orlando Rizo and
Abner Cotto (PR) in the final 7:5.

He lost his national title 2008 to archrival Iván Oñate but was sent to the qualifier where he qualified for the Olympics by beating Robson Conceiçao and Luis Enrique Porozo.
In Beijing he beat Prince Octopus Dzanie 11:2, Enkhzorig Zorigtbaatar 10:9 but lost to Shahin Imranov 16:18 and didn't medal.

In 2009 he went up to lightweight but lost the national final to Lorenzo Sotamayor.
He was sent regardless to the 2009 World Amateur Boxing Championships where he beat two unknowns then ran into favorite Domenico Valentino and lost 5:10.

References

 National title 2007
 PanAm Results 2007
 Olympics

Living people
1986 births
Featherweight boxers
Boxers at the 2007 Pan American Games
Boxers at the 2008 Summer Olympics
Olympic boxers of Cuba
Cuban male boxers
Pan American Games gold medalists for Cuba
Pan American Games medalists in boxing
Medalists at the 2007 Pan American Games
21st-century Cuban people